Jim Robinson (born 1925), known as "Sweet Jimmy", was an American boxer from Miami. Robinson fought Muhammad Ali (at that time still called Cassius Clay) in Miami Beach on February 7, 1961 as a last-minute replacement for Willie Gullatt. Robinson became Ali's fourth professional opponent. His whereabouts and status are currently unknown.

Background
Originally from Kansas City, Missouri, Robinson was a middleweight boxer who fought up to heavyweight. He was managed by Clyde Killens, a local pool hall owner. He was often used as a last minute sub on Chris Dundee promotions in Miami-Dade County and was often used as a stepping-stone for upcoming South Florida prospects. He trained at the famed 5th Street Gym, but lived in the Overtown section of Miami known as Liberty City.

Bout with Clay/Ali
On February 7, 1961, Cassius Clay (later known as Muhammad Ali), was scheduled to fight Willie Gullatt in Miami Beach. According to Gullatt, promoter Chris Dundee, Angelo Dundee's brother, offered Clay $800 and offered Gullatt only $300 for the fight. Gullatt refused, and did not show up, instead opting to go out drinking. Dundee then enlisted Robinson to fight Clay. Robinson showed up at Miami Beach Convention Hall with his gear in an old army bag. Clay officially outweighed him by 16.5 pounds and won by knockout at 1:34 of the first round.

Robinson fought for seven more years while compiling a record of 8 wins and 25 losses. He was knocked out 16 times. He retired from boxing in 1963 and became a fixture in local pool halls and street corners in Liberty City. In 1968 he came out of retirement to fight Kent Green in Miami Beach. At that time Green was the only fighter to have a TKO win over Muhammad Ali (when Ali was an amateur). Green stopped Robinson in under a minute.

Whereabouts unknown
In 1979 Sports Illustrated writer/photographer Michael Brennan tracked down Robinson in Miami for what has been his last known interview to date. Robinson claimed that he only weighed 158 lbs. for his fight with Ali (not 178 as was officially listed). He also stated that he was good friends with Ali and would drive him around in Ali's pink Cadillac. He last saw Ali in 1967. Since this interview, Robinson's whereabouts have been unknown. In 2009, ESPN sports writer Wright Thompson wrote an article about his six-year attempt to find Robinson in the Overtown district of Miami with no success.

Ali collector Stephen Singer has spent a number of years searching for Robinson, collecting autographs of 49 of Ali's 50 opponents, with Robinson being the lone omission.

Professional boxing record

|-
|align="center" colspan=8|8 Wins (3 knockouts, 5 decisions), 25 Losses (16 knockouts, 9 decisions)
|-
| align="center" style="border-style: none none solid solid; background: #e3e3e3"|Result
| align="center" style="border-style: none none solid solid; background: #e3e3e3"|Record
| align="center" style="border-style: none none solid solid; background: #e3e3e3"|Opponent
| align="center" style="border-style: none none solid solid; background: #e3e3e3"|Type
| align="center" style="border-style: none none solid solid; background: #e3e3e3"|Round
| align="center" style="border-style: none none solid solid; background: #e3e3e3"|Date
| align="center" style="border-style: none none solid solid; background: #e3e3e3"|Location
| align="center" style="border-style: none none solid solid; background: #e3e3e3"|Notes
|-align=center
|Loss
|8–27
|align=left| Kent Green
|TKO
|1
|31/10/1968
|align=left| Miami
|align=left|
|-
|Loss
|8–26
|align=left| Richie Smith
|PTS
|6
|07/05/1964
|align=left| Little River Auditorium, Miami
|align=left|
|-
|Loss
|8–24
|align=left| Ray Lavarro
|PTS
|6
|05/05/1964
|align=left| North Dade Arena, Opa-locka, Florida
|align=left|
|-
|Loss
|8–23
|align=left| Willie Johnson
|KO
|3
|09/04/1964
|align=left| Little River Auditorium, Miami
|align=left|
|-
|Loss
|8–22
|align=left| Eddie Agin
|KO
|3
|14/10/1963
|align=left| Key West, Florida
|align=left|
|-
|Loss
|8–21
|align=left| Vince Hepburn
|KO
|2
|21/03/1963
|align=left| Little River Auditorium, Miami
|align=left|
|-
|Loss
|8–20
|align=left| Jack Gilbert
|PTS
|4
|25/02/1963
|align=left| North Miami Beach Auditorium, North Miami Beach, Florida
|align=left|
|-
|Loss
|8–19
|align=left| Andy Mayfield
|TKO
|4
|24/01/1963
|align=left| Little River Auditorium, Miami
|align=left|
|-
|Loss
|8–18
|align=left| Ray Lavarro
|UD
|6
|10/01/1963
|align=left| Little River Auditorium, Miami
|align=left|
|-
|Loss
|8–17
|align=left| Bobo Reckley
|KO
|5
|19/11/1962
|align=left| Miami
|align=left|
|-
|Loss
|8–16
|align=left| Bobo Reckley
|KO
|4
|08/11/1962
|align=left| Little River Auditorium, Miami
|align=left|
|-
|Loss
|8–15
|align=left| Junior Grant
|SD
|6
|14/06/1962
|align=left| Little River Auditorium, Miami
|align=left|
|-
|Win
|8–14
|align=left| Gene Wells
|PTS
|6
|28/04/1962
|align=left| Miami Beach Auditorium, Miami Beach, Florida
|align=left|
|-
|Loss
|7–14
|align=left| Frank Patterson
|TKO
|4
|29/03/1962
|align=left| Little River Auditorium, Miami
|align=left|
|-
|Loss
|7–13
|align=left| Frank Patterson
|PTS
|4
|17/03/1962
|align=left| Miami Beach Auditorium, Miami Beach, Florida
|align=left|
|-
|Loss
|7–12
|align=left| Roger Whitley
|KO
|2
|28/02/1962
|align=left| Miami Beach Auditorium, Miami Beach, Florida
|align=left|
|-
|Loss
|7–11
|align=left| Herb Siler
|TKO
|5
|08/02/1962
|align=left| Little River Auditorium, Miami
|align=left|
|-
|Loss
|7–10
|align=left| Jim Tillman
|PTS
|4
|11/01/1962
|align=left| Little River Auditorium, Miami
|align=left|
|-
|Loss
|7–9
|align=left| Jim McNeil
|PTS
|6
|13/11/1961
|align=left| Little River Auditorium, Miami
|align=left|
|-
|Win
|7–8
|align=left|Tommy Lee
|PTS
|6
|06/11/1961
|align=left| Little River Auditorium, Miami
|align=left|
|-
|Win
|6–8
|align=left|Tom Cox
|KO
|1
|17/10/1961
|align=left| Cutler Ridge, Miami
|align=left|
|-
|Win
|5–8
|align=left| Tiger Lee Flowers
|PTS
|4
|09/10/1961
|align=left| Sir John Club, Miami
|align=left|
|-
|Win
|4–8
|align=left| Jim Tillman
|SD
|6
|25/09/1961
|align=left| Sir John Club, Miami
|align=left|
|-
|Loss
|3–7
|align=left| Al Owens
|KO
|5
|18/09/1961
|align=left| Sir John Club, Miami
|align=left|
|-
|Win
|3–6
|align=left|Ted Jones
|KO
|3
|11/09/1961
|align=left| Sir John Club, Miami
|align=left|
|-
|Win
|2–6
|align=left| Willie Johnson
|UD
|6
|07/09/1961
|align=left| Little River Auditorium, Miami
|align=left|
|-
|Loss
|1–6
|align=left| Joe Moss
|TKO
|5
|17/07/1961
|align=left| Sir John Club, Miami
|align=left|
|-
|Loss
|1–5
|align=left| Yama Bahama
|KO
|6
|02/06/1961
|align=left| Nassau, Bahamas
|align=left|
|-
|Loss
|1–4
|align=left| Claude Williams
|KO
|1
|14/04/1961
|align=left| Winter Haven, Florida
|align=left|
|-
|Loss
|1–3
|align=left| Cassius Clay
|KO
|1
|07/02/1961
|align=left| Miami Beach Auditorium, Miami Beach, Florida
|align=left|
|-
|Loss
|1–2
|align=left| Al Owens
|PTS
|4
|08/11/1960
|align=left| North Miami, Florida
|align=left|
|-
|Loss
|1–1
|align=left| Allan Harmon
|KO
|3
|13/10/1960
|align=left| Key West, Florida
|align=left|
|-
|Win
|1–0
|align=left|Willie Johnson
|TKO
|3
|13/06/1960
|align=left| Palace Arena, Miami
|align=left|

References

External links
 

1925 births
Missing people
Possibly living people
Boxers from Florida
Heavyweight boxers
American male boxers
1970s missing person cases
Date of birth missing